In September 2016, the International Union for Conservation of Nature (IUCN) listed 411 vulnerable reptile species. Of all evaluated reptile species, 8.0% are listed as vulnerable. 
The IUCN also lists ten reptile subspecies as vulnerable.

No subpopulations of reptiles have been evaluated as vulnerable by the IUCN.

For a species to be assessed as vulnerable to extinction the best available evidence must meet quantitative criteria set by the IUCN designed to reflect "a high risk of extinction in the wild". Endangered and critically endangered species also meet the quantitative criteria of vulnerable species, and are listed separately. See: List of endangered reptiles, List of critically endangered reptiles. Vulnerable, endangered and critically endangered species are collectively referred to as threatened species by the IUCN. 

Additionally 910 reptile species (18% of those evaluated) are listed as data deficient, meaning there is insufficient information for a full assessment of conservation status. As these species typically have small distributions and/or populations, they are intrinsically likely to be threatened, according to the IUCN. While the category of data deficient indicates that no assessment of extinction risk has been made for the taxa, the IUCN notes that it may be appropriate to give them "the same degree of attention as threatened taxa, at least until their status can be assessed".

This is a complete list of vulnerable reptile species and subspecies evaluated by the IUCN.

Turtles and tortoises
There are 62 turtle species assessed as vulnerable.

Tortoises

Geoemydids

Trionychids

Chelids

Emydids

Other turtle species

Crocodilia species

Tuatara
Brothers Island tuatara (Sphenodon guntheri)

Lizards
There are 244 species and nine subspecies of lizard assessed as vulnerable.

Iguanids

Species

Subspecies

Flap-footed lizards

Anguids

Girdled lizards

Chameleons

Plated lizards

Anoles

Gekkonids

Wall lizards
Species

Subspecies
Zootoca vivipara pannonica

Skinks
Species

Subspecies
Egernia stokesii aethiops
Jurien Bay rock-skink (Liopholis pulchra longicauda)

Spectacled lizards

Teiids

Dragon lizards

Phyllodactylids

Phrynosomatids

Liolaemids

Other lizard species

Snakes
There are 100 species and one subspecies of snake assessed as vulnerable.

Pseudoxyrhophiids

Vipers
Species
Barbour's short-headed viper (Atheris barbouri)
Usambara eyelash viper (Atheris ceratophora)
Plain mountain adder (Bitis inornata)
Namaqua dwarf adder (Bitis schneideri)
Yellow-blotched palm pit viper (Bothriechis aurifer)
Rowley's palm pit viper (Bothriechis rowleyi)
Piraja's lancehead (Bothrops pirajai)
Crotalus stejnegeri
Hon Son pit viper (Cryptelytrops honsonensis)
Ruby-eyed green pitviper (Cryptelytrops rubeus)
Shedao Island pit viper (Gloydius shedaoensis)
Montivipera albicornuta
Ophryacus undulatus
Cameron highlands pit viper (Popeia nebularis)
Caucasus subalpine viper (Vipera dinniki)
Iranian mountain steppe viper (Vipera ebneri)
Alburzi viper (Vipera eriwanensis)
Lataste's viper (Vipera latastei)
Meadow viper (Vipera ursinii)
Subspecies
Atlantic bushmaster (Lachesis muta rhombeata)

Dipsadids

Elapids

Colubrids

Keelbacks

Other snake species

See also 
 Lists of IUCN Red List vulnerable species
 List of least concern reptiles
 List of near threatened reptiles
 List of endangered reptiles
 List of critically endangered reptiles
 List of recently extinct reptiles
 List of data deficient reptiles

References 

Reptiles
Vulnerable reptiles
Vulnerable reptiles
Reptile conservation